The Harem World Tour was the third worldwide concert tour by English soprano singer Sarah Brightman following the release of the Harem album (2003). The tour began on 10 January 2004 in Mexico City and concluded on 23 December that year in Tokyo, Japan. The Harem tour became Brightman's highest-grossing tour, collecting $60 million in revenue and sold 800,000 tickets, $15 million and 225,000 sales of which came from the North American leg. The tour brought Brightman to perform in 4 continents, 28 countries in 119 venues.

Background
In May 2003 Sarah released her Middle East-oriented album Harem. To promote it together with audiovisual project "Harem – A Desert Fantasy" Brightman in collaboration with Clear Channel Entertainment decided to create a new tour, that will be different from the previous La Luna World Tour. Promoters wanted to turn show from theater audiences to a more arena-like. Promotion for the tour included many billboards and ads in theaters and corresponding media because some of Sarah's fans "haven't experienced arena shows very well". The European leg of the tour was initially planned for April and May but was postponed to the autumn of the same year due to logistical difficulties.

Set List

Kama Sutra
Harem
Beautiful
It's a Beautiful Day
Dust in the Wind
Who Wants to Live Forever
Anytime, Anywhere
Nella Fantasia
Stranger in Paradise
La Luna
Nessun Dorma
Intermission 
No One Like You
Arabian Nights
The War Is Over
Free
What a Wonderful World
A Whiter Shade of Pale
Phantom of the Opera medley: 
Twisted Every Way
Overture
Little Lottie
Wishing You Were Somehow Here Again
Time to Say Goodbye
The Journey Home
A Question of Honour

Tour dates

Video release
The concert in Las Vegas on 13 March was recorded and then made available commercially in CD and DVD entitled The Harem World Tour: Live from Las Vegas.

Box Score

References

Sarah Brightman concert tours
2004 concert tours